Sir William Traven Aitken,  (10 June 1903 – 19 January 1964) was a Canadian-British journalist and politician who was an MP in the UK parliament for 14 years. He was a nephew of Lord Beaverbrook.

Early life and family
Aitken was born on 10 June 1903, the son of Joseph Mauns Aitken of Toronto. He was educated at Upper Canada College, the oldest independent school in Canada, and went on to the University of Toronto, where he was a member of the Kappa Alpha Society. In the late 1920s he travelled through Canada and the United States, before settling in England in 1930. In 1938 he married Penelope Loader Maffey, daughter of Sir John Maffey (later Lord Rugby, and a leading civil servant); they had one son and one daughter, Maria Aitken .

Wartime service
He found a living as a financial journalist on the staff of the Evening Standard. When the Second World War broke out, Aitken joined the Royal Air Force and piloted fighter reconnaissance aircraft; he was severely injured in 1945 and invalided out. His son Jonathan Aitken, later a politician, was born in 1942, and his daughter Maria Aitken, later an actress, was born in 1945. Penelope Aitken became a leading socialite in post-war society. His grandson, Jack Davenport, became an actor. Alexandra Aitken is the grand-daughter of Sir William.

Career
At the 1945 general election, Aitken was the Conservative Party candidate who attempted to recapture West Derbyshire; he lost by only 156 votes. He became instead Manager of London Express News and Feature Services while he searched for another Parliamentary nomination. He was also a director of Shop Investments Ltd and Western Ground Rents Ltd, both of which were property investment companies.

Parliament 
In 1948, Aitken was adopted as Conservative candidate for Bury St Edmunds in Suffolk, in succession to Geoffrey Clifton-Brown who was standing down. At the 1950 general election, Aitken was elected by 4,129 votes. In Parliament, Aitken showed a particular interest in Commonwealth issues, and was elected Vice-Chairman of the Conservative Commonwealth Affairs Committee. In 1951 he called for reform of the House of Lords so that it included representatives of the Colonies, Dominions and states of the Commonwealth.

Aitken was a rare speaker, choosing to intervene only in those debates where he had a particular knowledge. He remained a backbencher although he was a member of the round-table conference on the constitution of Malta in 1955. His support for the Commonwealth made him distrust attempts to have the United Kingdom sign the Treaty of Rome. His most famous action in Parliament was to introduce his Private Member's Bill of 1961, the Highways (Miscellaneous Provisions) Bill, which gave local authorities more powers to remove obstructions to roads and to acquire land to build straight roads.

In 1960 Aitken voted to support a Labour amendment to the Betting Levy Board to reduce the Jockey Club's members of the Horserace Betting Levy Board to one, on the grounds that there should also be a veterinary surgeon on the board. In 1962, Aitken was given the honour of moving the 'loyal address' after the Queen's Speech. He was made a Knight Commander of the Order of the British Empire in the Queen's Birthday Honours of 1963.

Death
He died suddenly in January 1964 aged 60. He is buried in the churchyard of St. Mary's, Playford, Suffolk.

References

Citations

Bibliography 
 Stenton, M., Lees, S. (1981). Who's Who of British Members of Parliament, volume iv (covering 1945–1979). Sussex: The Harvester Press; New Jersey: Humanities Press. 
"Who Was Who", A & C Black
Obituary, The Times, 20 January 1964

External links 
 

1903 births
1964 deaths
Aitken family
Conservative Party (UK) MPs for English constituencies
UK MPs 1950–1951
UK MPs 1951–1955
UK MPs 1955–1959
UK MPs 1959–1964
Knights Commander of the Order of the British Empire
Canadian male journalists
Journalists from Toronto
Royal Air Force officers
Canadian expatriates in England
University of Toronto alumni
Upper Canada College alumni